is a Japanese model and singer-songwriter born on 2 May 1958 in Okinawa Prefecture. Horikawa was selected as the fourth Clarion Girl in 1978, and debuted as a singer that same year under producer Masataka Matsutōya.

Horikawa has written and composed songs for popular artists including Miki Imai, Jun'ichi Inagaki, Yukiko Okada, Kyōko Koizumi, Yuki Saito, Noriko Sakai, Miho Nakayama, Yū Hayami, Chiemi Hori, Saori Yagi, and Marina Watanabe.

Discography

Albums
The Art of Romance(1993)
 (1978)
Maym (1986)
Olive (1979)

Composition

References

1958 births
Japanese women singer-songwriters
Japanese idols
Japanese women pop singers
Living people
People from Okinawa Prefecture
20th-century Japanese women singers
20th-century Japanese singers